Barettin is a brominated alkaloid made of a dehydrogenated brominated derivative of tryptophan linked by two peptide bonds to an arginine residue, forming a 2,5-diketopiperazine nucleus. It is a cyclic dipeptide.

Barettin is the major compound in the deep-sea sponge Geodia barretti. It was isolated for the first time in 1986 by Göran Lidgren, Lars Bohlin and Jan Bergman at Uppsala University, Sweden but the correct chemical structure was determined later in 2002. Barettin is written with one 'r' because the authors misspelled Geodia barretti with one 'r' in the original paper.

Barettin seems to show antioxidant and anti-inflammatory properties which could be used in treating diseases that affect the immune system and diseases that are caused by inflammation. Atherosclerosis, a disease characterized by stiffening and a buildup of compounds in arteries, may be prevented by barettin due to its anti-inflammatory properties. The effects barettin has on inflammation may be due to its inhibitory properties on two protein kinases, receptor-interacting serine/threonine kinase 2 (RIPK2) and calcium/calmodulin-dependent protein kinase 1α (CAMK1α).

References 

Indole alkaloids
Bromoarenes
Guanidine alkaloids
Diketopiperazines
Alkene derivatives
Halogen-containing alkaloids